Lorina is a company that produces soft drinks. It was founded by Victor Geyer in 1895 in Munster, France, and was acquired by Royal Unibrew of Denmark in 2018.

External links
Lorina web site

Lemonade

Orange sodas